Malaysia competed in the 1982 Asian Games in New Delhi, India from 19 November to 4 December 1982. Malaysia ended the games at 4 overall medals including only 1 gold medal.

Medal summary

Medals by sport

Medallists

Athletics

Men
Track events

Basketball

Men's tournament
Group C

Final round

Ranked 7th in final standings

Field hockey

Men's tournament
Bronze medal match

Ranked 3rd in final standings

Women's tournament
Ranked 3rd in final standings

Football

Men's tournament
Group C

Ranked 14th in final standings

References

Nations at the 1982 Asian Games
1982
Asian Games